Yousef Raed Al-Alousi (Arabic: يوسف رائد الألوسي; born 17 December 1993) is a Jordanian footballer who is a defender for Amanat Baghdad.

References

External links 
 
 jo.gitsport.net

Living people
1993 births
Jordanian footballers
Jordan international footballers
Jordanian expatriate footballers
Jordanian Pro League players
Iraqi Premier League players
Jordanian expatriate sportspeople in Iraq
Expatriate footballers in Iraq
Al-Faisaly SC players
Shabab Al-Ordon Club players
Naft Al-Wasat SC players
Al-Naft SC players
Amanat Baghdad players
Association football defenders